Stephanie Dixon,  (born February 10, 1984) is a Canadian swimmer. Prior to the 2008 Paralympic Games in Beijing, Dixon had accumulated fifteen Paralympic medals and is considered to be one of the best swimmers with a disability in the world.

Born missing her right leg and hip and with an omphalocele, she began to swim at the age of two. At the age of 13, she began competitive swimming against athletes without disabilities. At the age of 14, she joined Canada's national Paralympic team. She uses underarm crutches.

Sporting career
She represented Canada at the 2000 Summer Paralympics in Sydney, at the age of 16, and won five gold medals. With 5 golds, she set the Canadian record for most golds at a single Games. Representing her country again at the 2004 Summer Paralympics in Athens, she won one gold, six silver, and one bronze, In the ParaPan American Games in Rio de Janeiro, she won 7 gold medals. She participated in the Paralympic Games for the third time in Beijing in 2008.

Dixon has also won several medals and set several world records at World Championships and at the Commonwealth Games.

She has been added to the Canadian Disability Hall of Fame. and the Canada's Sports Hall of Fame.

Post-competition career 

She earned a B.A. in Psychology from the University of Victoria.

In 2021, Dixon began pursuing a master's degree in kinesiology at the University of Toronto.

References

External links
 Stephanie Dixon at Swimming Canada
 
 
 

1984 births
Living people
Canadian female medley swimmers
Canadian female backstroke swimmers
Canadian female freestyle swimmers
Canadian amputees
Sportspeople with limb difference
Paralympic swimmers of Canada
Paralympic gold medalists for Canada
Paralympic silver medalists for Canada
Paralympic bronze medalists for Canada
Swimmers at the 2000 Summer Paralympics
Swimmers at the 2004 Summer Paralympics
Swimmers at the 2008 Summer Paralympics
Medalists at the 2000 Summer Paralympics
Medalists at the 2004 Summer Paralympics
Medalists at the 2008 Summer Paralympics
World record holders in paralympic swimming
Place of birth missing (living people)
Members of the Order of Canada
S9-classified Paralympic swimmers
Canadian Disability Hall of Fame
Medalists at the World Para Swimming Championships
Paralympic medalists in swimming